The 2014 America East men's lacrosse tournament was the 15th edition of the America East Conference men's lacrosse tournament and took place from May 1 to May 3 that year at Kenneth P. LaValle Stadium in Stony Brook, New York. The winner of the tournament received the America East Conference's automatic bid to the 2014 NCAA Division I Men's Lacrosse Championship. Four teams from the America East conference will compete in the single elimination tournament. The seeds were based upon the teams' regular season conference record.

Standings
Only the top four teams in the America East conference advanced to the America East Conference Tournament.

Schedule

Bracket
Kenneth P. LaValle Stadium - Stony Brook, New York

 denotes an overtime game

All-Tournament
Doug Eich, Albany

Lyle Thompson, Albany

Miles Thompson, Albany

Ty Thompson, Albany

Blaze Riorden, Albany

Zach Esser, UMBC

Matt Gregoire, UMBC

Phil Poe, UMBC

Michael Antinozzi, Binghamton

Greg Cove, Binghamton

Mike Andreassi, Stony Brook

Hayden Johnstone, Stony Brook

Most Outstanding Player
Lyle Thompson, Albany

Most Outstanding Goalie
Blaze Riorden, Albany

Tournament notes 

 Just like in the previous year's tournament Albany and Stony Brook again set a tournament record of combined goals with 33.

References 

http://www.americaeast.com/SportSelect.dbml?SPSID=65879&SPID=6539&DB_OEM_ID=14000&Q_SEASON=2013 Retrieved 2015-05-09.

http://www.americaeast.com/pdf9/2699888.pdf?DB_OEM_ID=14000 Retrieved 2015-05-09.

http://www.americaeast.com/standings/Standings.dbml?SPID=6539&DB_OEM_ID=14000&DEF_FY=2013 Retrieved 2015-05-09.

http://www.collegecrosse.com/2014/4/28/5655824/america-east-lacrosse-tournament-ncaa-albany-binghamton-umbc-stony-brook-time-date-tv-stream-free Retrieved 2015-05-09.

External links

2014 in lacrosse
America East Men's Lacrosse